Mary Elizabeth Simpson Sperry was a leading California suffragist who served as president of the California Woman Suffrage Association.

Suffrage work 

Mary Sperry was one of the leading suffragists in the state of California and was personally supported by noted suffragist Susan B. Anthony. According to suffrage scholar Rebecca Mead, Anthony believed Sperry "links the old people to the new" and endorsed Sperry as leader of the California Woman Suffrage Association which as affiliated with the National American Woman Suffrage Association. Her work as treasurer was recognized in the History of Woman Suffrage published by Anthony and Elizabeth Cady Stanton. In volume VI of that publication it was noted that Sperry participated in a major suffrage conference in San Francisco in 1902.  

Sperry also corresponded about the suffrage movement with philanthropist Phoebe Hearst. In a letter dated September 30, 1911, Sperry wrote to Hearst saying, ""I wish to acknowledge the pleasure it gave me at our recent Club meeting, when you told me that you favored 'Votes for Women.' Perhaps you do not realize how much it means to me, who have worked for it so long, to know that women like you are on our side."

1896 campaign for women's suffrage 
Mary Sperry was actively involved in the failed 1896 campaign for women's suffrage in California. She served as treasurer to the state suffrage association and wrote opinion articles advocating for the passage of what was known as Amendment 6. Much of her work was organized from Market Street in San Francisco. National suffragist Anna Howard Shaw was quoted on this failed campaign as saying "it was not a Waterloo; it was Bunker Hill."

California Equal Suffrage Association 
The California Equal Suffrage Association was incorporated in 1904. Sperry was involved in this organization from on beginning and worked with many other California suffragists including Gail Laughlin, Ellen C. Sargent, Alice L. Park and Minora Kibbe.

1911 campaign in California 

Sperry was politically active in the 1911 campaign for women's suffrage in California. That year she served as president of the Susan B. Anthony Club. In the early 1900s, she served as president of the California Woman Suffrage Association where she organized hundreds of suffragists. In this organization, worked alongside noted suffragists such as Gail Laughlin and Sperry's daughter Dr. Mary Austin Sperry. She served as president of this organization from 1902-1907. The Stockton Record published her successful re-election in 1903. In 1905 she presided over a major suffage convention on Sutter Street in San Francisco. Suffragist Dr. Minora Kibbe also attended this convention.

Sperry personally saw women vote in Denver in 1908 and would share stories of these women voters with suffragists in California.

Political activism 
Sperry lobbied for suffrage through a variety of different organizations including the Century Club, the Susan B. Anthony Club and the California Club. Sperry's work in the California Club involved recruiting women into the cause of working for suffrage. She played a pivotal role in securing women's suffrage in the state of California and was photographed voting in the 1912 California election.

Personal life 

Mary Simpson Sperry moved to California after she married Austin Sperry, founder of the Sperry Flour Company, in 1862. The last 33 years of her life were spent in San Francisco. Her personal wealth helped fund the suffrage cause in California. The Sperry family were a prominent family in the city of Stockton, California. When her daughter, Dr. Mary A. Sperry died, Mary Simpson Sperry contested her will as Dr. Sperry had lived for many years with suffragist Gail Laughlin.

Mary Sperry died in April 1921 and is buried alongside many of her relatives in Stockton.

References

American suffragists
American feminists
People from California
California suffrage